The Ural State University (often shortened to USU, УрГУ) is a public university located in the city of Yekaterinburg, Sverdlovsk Oblast, Russian Federation. Founded in 1920, it was an exclusive educational establishment made of several institutes (educational and scientific divisions) which later became independent universities and schools.

Established in 1936 the university was named after one of its founders, Russian author Maxim Gorky. It is the second oldest University in the Middle Urals (the oldest being Urals State University of Mines) and one of the most prestigious universities in Russia; preparing research, educational and managerial elite on the basis of the integration of academic process and scientific research. It offers education in dozens of scientific and educational fields including 53 graduate programs.  
In 2007 Dmitriy Bugrov was elected new rector, while the incumbent Vladimir Tretyakov took the office of the President, representing the university in international affairs.

The USU is organized into 95 chairs and 14 departments. These are Biology, Journalism, Culturology & Arts, History, Mathematics and Mechanics, Politology and Sociology, Psychology, Physics,  Philology, Philosophy, Public relations, Chemistry, Foreign affairs, and Economics. Among the university's faculty there are 18 academicians of the Russian Academy of Sciences.

The university also has a lyceum, the Leonardo Italian College, an Institute of Physics and Applied Mathematics, an Interregional Institute of Social Sciences, the Russian-American Institute of Economy and Business, the Institute of Management and Entrepreneurship, a distance education center, the Russian Culture Institute, an observatory, a botanical garden, a scientific library with over 1,200,000 volumes, a publishing house, several museums, a special chair of Russian as foreign language, a laboratory for e-learning of foreign languages, and offers refresher courses and Institutes for Further Education and Training.

Every year the Ural State University hosts the Demidov Lectures - a series of lectures given by the Demidov Prize winners.

Since 2010, the university has been The Ural Federal university after Boris Yeltsin. It was caused by the Russian Federation's President's decree #1172 from 21 October 2010. The university is now joint with The Ural State Technical University.

Scientific Schools

The most prominent scientific schools created in Ural State University:
 Ural scientific school in electrochemistry founded by Professor S. V. Karpachiov
 Ural scientific school in ferromagnetism founded by Academician Sergei Vonsovsky
 Ural scientific school in population ecology founded by Academician Stanislav Shwarts
 Ural scientific school in sociology founded by Professor L. N. Kogan
 Ural scientific school in Byzantine studies founded by Professor M. Syuzyumov
 Ural scientific school in algebra founded by Professor P. G. Kontorovich
 Ural scientific school in the generalized functions theory and the ill-posed problems theory founded by Professor V. K. Ivanov
 Ural scientific school in mathematical theory of control and the theory of differential games founded by Academician Nikolai Nikolaevich Krasovsky, winner of the Lomonosov Gold Medal of the Russian Academy of Sciences
 Ural scientific school in toponymy founded by Professor Aleksandr Matveyev
 Ural scientific school in photosynthesis founded by Academician A. T. Mokronosov

Rankings
USU was ranked 25th among Russian Ministry of Education's top universities in 2004 official university ranking of the Russian Ministry for Education, of the Russian Ministry for Education, 2004</ref> According to the Webometrics Ranking's which is based on the volume of the web presence and the amount of web publications, USU is ranked 7th in Russia's top 100 Webometrics' list of universities in Russia.

Notable alumni

 Alexander Bashlachev - famous poet, rock musician, songwriter
 Vitaly Bugrov - Soviet literary critic, historian of science fiction
 Gennady Burbulis - State and public figure, the State Secretary of the RSFSR
 Chernikov, Sergei - mathematician, Academician
 Erna Daugaviete (1906 – 1991), chemist
 Alexei Ivanov - writer
 Sholban Kara-ool - statesman, Prime Minister of the Republic of Tuva
 Mikhail Katsnelson - Dutch professor of theoretical physics at Radboud University Nijmegen
 Faina Mihajlovna Kirillova - mathematician and control theorist
 Viktor Koksharov - head of the government of Sverdlovsk Oblast
 Ilya Kormiltsev - poet, interpreter, rock musician
 Nadezhda Kozhushanaya - writer, screenwriter, author of the screenplay for the film "The Mirror for a Hero" (1987) and "Foot" (1991)
 Vladislav Krapivin - author of children's books
 Galina Kurlyandskaya (born 1961), Russian physicist
 Anastasia Lapsui (b. 1944) - Nenets film director, screenwriter, radio journalist
 Vladimir Motyl - film director
 Anatoly V. Oleynik - chemist and professor
 Yury Osipov - President of the Russian Academy of Sciences, member of the Russian government
 Boris Plotnikov - Actor, People's Artist of Russia
 Presnyakov brothers - playwrights
 Yevgeny Roizman - Russian politician. He served as Mayor of Yekaterinburg from 2013 to 2018
 Ryzhy, Boris - poet
 Sergei Shmatko - statesman, Minister of Energy (May 12, 2008)
 Konstantin Syomin - journalist, TV presenter
 Vladimir Tretyakov - former rector, present-day  president of the USU
 Gennady Zdanovich - archeologists, the creator of the archaeological school

Emblem
The location and the set of the symbols on the emblem of the Ural State University were officially approved on 24 April 2008.

The emblem centre represents the cross of Saint Catherine of Alexandria, the patroness of Yekaterinburg. This is the concave-spiked four-part cross. Spikes, which form the cross, refer to one more symbol – the staff of Egyptian priests, keepers of sacred knowledge. This staff is also called the staff of Anthony the Great, which symbolizes search and attainment of truth. 
A solar symbol – a cogwheel, put on the cross, symbolizes the sun and the light of knowledge. At the same time the wheel and the cross are St. Catherine's attribute, who, according to the legend, was condemned to be broken on the wheel.

The three books symbolize the unity of the natural sciences, the formal sciences and the humanities and refer to the motto of the emblem: “Beware the man of one book”. (Thomas Aquinas)

See also
 Ural State Law Academy
 Ural State Technical University
 List of modern universities in Europe (1801–1945)

References

External links
The official site of the Ural State University
Proceedings of the Ural State University - free on-line version

 
Buildings and structures in Yekaterinburg
Ural Federal University